Peter Bartoš (born 5 September 1973) is a Slovak former professional ice hockey left winger currently playing for HK Bardejov in the Slovak 2.Liga. He was drafted in the seventh round, 214th overall, by the Minnesota Wild in the 2000 NHL Entry Draft.  He played thirteen games in the National Hockey League with the Wild in the 2000–01 season.

Career statistics

Regular season and playoffs

International

External links

1973 births
Living people
Cleveland Lumberjacks players
KH Sanok players
HC Košice players
HK Dukla Trenčín players
HKM Zvolen players
MHC Martin players
Minnesota Wild draft picks
Minnesota Wild players
Motor České Budějovice players
Sportspeople from Martin, Slovakia
Slovak ice hockey left wingers
Slovak expatriate ice hockey players in the Czech Republic
Slovak expatriate ice hockey players in the United States
Slovak expatriate sportspeople in Poland
Expatriate ice hockey players in Poland
Czechoslovak ice hockey left wingers